, popularly known as Riamu is a Japanese kickboxer, currently competing in the super bantamweight division of K-1. A professional competitor since 2018, he is the current Krush Super Bantamweight (-55kg) champion.

As of August 2021 he was the #8 ranked Flyweight in the world by Combat Press.

Kickboxing career

Krush

Early career
Riamu was scheduled to make his professional debut against Hiroaki Shinohara at Krush.87 on April 22, 2018. He won the fight by a first-round technical knockout.

Riamu was scheduled to face Kosuke at KHAOS.7 on November 17, 2018. He won the fight by a first-round technical knockout, dropping  Kosuke with several well place knees and hooks.

Riamu was scheduled to make his K-1 debut against Lyra in the preliminary portion of the K-1 WORLD GP 2019 JAPAN ～K'FESTA.2～ on March 10, 2019. He won the fight by majority decision, with scores of 29–28, 29–29 and 30–29.

Move up to super bantamweight
Riamu was scheduled to face Akihiro at Krush.104 on August 31, 2019. He moved up to super bantamweight (55kg) for this bout, a two kilogram increase from his previous fights. Riamu won the fight by unanimous decision, with scores of 30–27, 30–28 and 29–28.

Riamu was scheduled to face Sho Uchida at K-1 KRUSH FIGHT 109 on December 15, 2019. He won the fight by a sensational first-round spinning back kick knockout.

Riamu was scheduled to make his second K-1 appearance against Ryuto on March 22, 2020, on the preliminary portion of the K'Festa 3 card. He won the fight by unanimous decision.

Riamu was expected to face Aoshi at Krush 113 on June 28, 2020. However, on June 7, it was announced that Riamu withdrew from the bout due to injury.

Riamu was scheduled to face the former Krush Bantamweight titleholder Junki Sasaki at K-1 World GP 2020 Winter's Crucial Bout on December 13, 2020. Sasaki won the fight by unanimous decision, with scores of 29–27, 30–26 and 30–26, thus handing Riamu his first professional loss. Riamu was deducted a point in the first round for holding Sasaki down.

Riamu was scheduled to face Aoshi at Krush 122 on February 27, 2021. The were expected to fight at Krush 113 on June 28, 2020, before Riamu withdrew from the bout. Riamu won the fight by unanimous decision, with all three judges scoring the fight 30–27 in his favor.

Krush Super Bantamweight champion

Krush Super Bantamweight tournament
Riamu participated in the 2021 Krush Super Bantamweight tournament, held to crown the new champion. Riamu was scheduled to face the former Krush Bantamweight champion Begin Yoshioka in the tournament quarterfinals, held at Krush 128 on August 21, 2021. Yoshioka failed to make weight for the fight, which meant Riamu would advance to the tournament semifinals regardless of the fight result. Additionally, Yoshioka entered the fight with a one point deduction and was forced to wear the heavier 10 oz gloves. Riamu won the fight by unanimous decision.

Riamu was scheduled to face Yuto Kuroda in the tournament semifinals, held at Krush 130 on October 31, 2021. He won the fight by unanimous decision, with all three judges awarding him a 30-28 scorecard. Although the first and third rounds were scored as a draw, the knockdown Riamu scored near the end of the second round was enough to earn him the victory. Riamu faced Momotaro Kiyama in the tournament finals. After a slow first round, Riamu upped the pace midway through the second round and dropped Kiyama with a right hook. This was quickly followed by a second knockdown with a left hook, before the referee stopped the fight at the very end of the second round.

K-1 super bantamweight tournament
During a press conference held on December 21, 2021, it was announced by K-1 that Riamu would participate in the 2022 Super Bantamweight World Grand Prix, which would be held at K-1 World GP 2022 Japan on February 27, 2022. Riamu faced Ikko in the tournament quarterfinals. He won the fight by a narrow unanimous decision, with all three judges scoring the bout 30–29 in his favor. Sera lost his semifinal bout against Akihiro Kaneko by a second-round technical knockout, as he was knocked down twice in the opening round, which resulted in a stoppage victory for Kaneko per the tournament rules.

Krush title reign
Riamu faced the two-time Rajadamnern Stadium title challenger Mutsuki Ebata at The Match 2022 on June 19, 2022. He lost the fight by an extra round split decision, with scores of 9–10, 9–10 and 10–9.

Riamu was expected to make his first Krush Super Bantamweight Championship defense against Lyra Nagasaki in the main event of Krush 143 on November 26, 2022. He withdrew from the fight on November 21, after suffering a metacarpal fracture of his right ring finger.

Titles and accomplishments

Kickboxing
Professional
Krush
 2021 Krush Super Bantamweight (-55kg) Champion

Amateur
 2017 K-1 Challenge A-class -55kg Tournament Winner & event MVP

Karate
 2015 IBKO All Japan U-15 -55kg Winner

Fight record

|-  style="text-align:center; background:#fbb"
| 2022-06-19 || Loss ||align=left| Mutsuki Ebata || THE MATCH 2022 || Tokyo, Japan || Ext.R Decision (Split)|| 4 || 3:00
|-
|- style="background:#fbb"
| 2022-02-27|| Loss||align=left| Akihiro Kaneko||  K-1 World GP 2022 Japan, Super Bantamweight GP Semi Finals || Tokyo, Japan || TKO (2 Knockdown/Low kick)  || 2 ||2:23  
|-
|- style="background:#cfc"
| 2022-02-27||Win ||align=left| Ikko Ota  ||  K-1 World GP 2022 Japan, Super Bantamweight World GP Quarter Finals || Tokyo, Japan ||  Decision (Unanimous) ||3 ||3:00  
|-
|-  style="background:#cfc;"
| 2021-10-31 ||Win || align=left| Momotaro Kiyama || Krush 130, -55kg Championship Tournament Final || Tokyo, Japan || TKO (3 Knockdowns/punches) || 2 || 3:00 
|-
! style=background:white colspan=9 |

|-  style="background:#cfc;"
| 2021-10-31 || Win|| align=left| Yuto Kuroda || Krush 130, -55kg Championship Tournament Semi Finals || Tokyo, Japan || Decision (Unanimous) || 3 || 3:00 
|-  style="background:#cfc;"
| 2021-08-21 || Win || align=left| Begin Yoshioka || Krush 128, -55kg Championship Tournament Quarter Finals || Tokyo, Japan || Decision (Unanimous) || 3 || 3:00
|-  style="background:#cfc;"
| 2021-02-27||Win ||align=left| Aoshi Kitano || Krush 122|| Tokyo, Japan || Decision (Unanimous) || 3 ||3:00
|-  style="background:#fbb;"
| 2020-12-13||Loss ||align=left| Junki Sasaki ||K-1 World GP 2020 Winter's Crucial Bout || Tokyo, Japan || Decision (Unanimous)|| 3|| 3:00
|-  style="background:#cfc;"
| 2020-03-22||Win ||align=left| Ryuto || K'Festa 3 || Saitama, Japan || Decision (Unanimous)||3 || 3:00
|-  style="background:#CCFFCC;"
| 2019-12-15||Win ||align=left| Sho Uchida || Krush.109 || Tokyo, Japan ||KO (Spinning Back Kick)|| 1 || 1:32
|-  style="background:#CCFFCC;"
| 2019-08-31||Win ||align=left| Akihiro || Krush.104 || Tokyo, Japan ||Decision (Unanimous) || 3 || 3:00
|-  style="background:#CCFFCC;"
| 2019-03-10||Win ||align=left| Lyra|| K-1 WORLD GP 2019 JAPAN ～K'FESTA.2～ || Saitama, Japan ||Decision (Majority) || 3 || 3:00
|-  style="background:#CCFFCC;"
| 2018-11-17||Win ||align=left| Kosuke || KHAOS.7 || Tokyo, Japan || TKO (Punches & Knees) || 1 || 0:59
|-  style="background:#CCFFCC;"
| 2018-04-22||Win ||align=left| Hiroaki Shinohara || Krush.87 || Tokyo, Japan ||TKO (Punches) || 1 || 1:05
|-
| colspan=9 | Legend:    

|-  style="background:#cfc;"
| 2017-10-22|| Win ||align=left| Shino Ishibashi|| K-1 Amateur Challenge A-class -55kg Tournament, Final || Tokyo, Japan ||  Decision (Unanimous) || 1 || 2:00
|-  style="background:#cfc;"
| 2017-10-22|| Win ||align=left| Aoi Noda || K-1 Amateur Challenge A-class -55kg Tournament, Semi Final || Tokyo, Japan || Ext.R Decision (Split) || 2 || 2:00
|-  style="background:#cfc;"
| 2017-10-22|| Win ||align=left| Yuya Kitahara || K-1 Amateur Challenge A-class -55kg Tournament, Quarter Final || Tokyo, Japan || KO || 1 ||
|-  style="background:#fbb;"
| 2017-09-03|| Loss ||align=left| Tsutomu Aoki || K-1 Amateur Challenge A-class -55kg Tournament, Semi Final || Tokyo, Japan || Decision (Majority) || 1 || 2:00
|-  style="background:#cfc;"
| 2017-09-03|| Win ||align=left| Tomoya Kawashima || K-1 Amateur Challenge A-class -55kg Tournament, Quarter Final || Tokyo, Japan || KO || 1 ||
|-  style="background:#fbb;"
| 2017-06-25|| Loss ||align=left| Jukiya Ito || K-1 Amateur Challenge A-class -55kg Tournament, Quarter Final || Tokyo, Japan || Decision (Unanimous) || 1 || 2:00
|-  style="background:#fbb;"
| 2017-04-29|| Loss ||align=left| Toki Tamaru || K-1 Amateur Challenge A-class -55kg Tournament, Semi Final || Tokyo, Japan || Decision (Unanimous) || 1 || 2:00
|-  style="background:#cfc;"
| 2017-04-29|| Win ||align=left| Daiki Nishimura || K-1 Amateur Challenge A-class -55kg Tournament, Quarter Final || Tokyo, Japan || KO || 1 ||
|-  style="background:#fbb;"
| 2017-03-26|| Loss ||align=left| Yuya Hashimoto || K-1 Amateur Challenge A-class -55kg Tournament, Quarter Final || Tokyo, Japan || Ext.R Decision (Split) || 2 || 2:00
|-  style="background:#cfc;"
| 2016-10-23|| Win ||align=left| Rikiya Yamaura || K-1 Amateur Challenge B-class -55kg Tournament, Final || Tokyo, Japan || Decision (Split) || 2 || 2:00
|-  style="background:#cfc;"
| 2016-10-23|| Win ||align=left| Kosuke Fukuma || K-1 Amateur Challenge B-class -55kg Tournament, Semi Final || Tokyo, Japan || Decision (Unanimous) || 2 || 2:00
|-  style="background:#fbb;"
| 2016-07-30|| Loss ||align=left| Tomoya Yokoyama || K-1 Koshien 2016 -55kg Tournament, First Round || Tokyo, Japan || Decision (Unanimous) || 1 || 2:00
|-  style="background:#fbb;"
| 2016-03-27|| Loss ||align=left| Kyosuke Yamaguchi || K-1 Amateur Junior B-class -55kg || Tokyo, Japan || Decision (Unanimous) || 1 || 2:00
|-  style="background:#cfc;"
| 2016-03-27|| Win ||align=left| Riku Fujishiro || K-1 Amateur Junior B-class -55kg || Tokyo, Japan || KO || 1 || 1:24 
|-
| colspan=9 | Legend:

See also
 List of male kickboxers

References

Living people
2000 births
Japanese male kickboxers
Sportspeople from Saitama Prefecture